Axel Schuster (born 11 February 1976) is a German rower. He competed in the men's lightweight coxless four event at the 2004 Summer Olympics.

References

External links
 

1976 births
Living people
German male rowers
Olympic rowers of Germany
Rowers at the 2004 Summer Olympics
Rowers from Berlin